Amatlán or Amatlan may refer to:

Amatlán de Cañas, municipality and municipal seat in the southwest of the Mexican state of Nayarit
Amatlán de los Reyes (municipality), municipality in Veracruz, Mexico
Naranjos Amatlán, Municipality in Veracruz, Mexico
San Cristobal Amatlán, town and municipality in Oaxaca in south-western Mexico
San Ildefonso Amatlán, town and municipality in Oaxaca in south-western Mexico
San Luis Amatlán, town and municipality in Oaxaca in south-western Mexico
San Miguel Amatlán, town and municipality in Oaxaca in south-western Mexico